Neptis poultoni is a butterfly in the family Nymphalidae. It is found in Uganda and the Democratic Republic of the Congo (Lomami and Lualaba).

The larvae feed on Clerodendron and Paullinia species.

References

Butterflies described in 1921
poultoni